Shepton High School is a secondary school in Plano, Texas (USA), serving grades nine and ten. It is part of the Plano Independent School District. In Plano ISD, high school freshmen and sophomores attend one of six high schools. Juniors and seniors attend "senior high schools." Renner and Frankford middle schools feed into Shepton. Shepton High School feeds into Plano West Senior High School along with Jasper High School.

Shepton High School maintains a population of over 1,500 students. Kathy King was the principal for eight years ending with the 2005-2006 school year.  Burt Smith held the role from 2006–12, during which he won the Texas Association of School Administrators "Administrator of the Year" award for the region.

History
Shepton High School is the second largest freshman/sophomore high school in PISD and was built on land once owned by Joseph W. Shepard.
The current principal of Shepton High School is David Jones.

Shepton High School opened in 1984 at its current location.  To accommodate the growth in the city, it moved to a larger facility from 1990-1998, located on Parker Road (and the current location of Plano West Senior High School).  Shepton has since moved back to its original location and undergone many renovations to the building.  In 2016, voters in Plano ISD approved a $481 million dollar bond package, with a substantial amount dedicated to Shepton campus renovations.

Awards
Shepton has won numerous awards for its participation in athletics, business, fine arts, and other programs throughout the school. The Shepton Chamber Orchestra of 2010-2011 won the Mark of Excellence in a national competition.

References

External links

Shepton high school history

2016 Plano ISD Bond

Educational institutions in the United States with year of establishment missing
High schools in Plano, Texas
Plano Independent School District high schools